, trading as Fujifilm, or simply Fuji, is a Japanese multinational conglomerate headquartered in Tokyo, Japan, operating in the realms of photography, optics, office and medical electronics, biotechnology, and chemicals.

The offerings from the company that started as a manufacturer of photographic films, which it still produces, include: document solutions, medical imaging and diagnostics equipment, cosmetics, pharmaceutical drugs, regenerative medicine, stem cells, biologics manufacturing, magnetic tape data storage, optical films for flat-panel displays, optical devices, photocopiers and printers, digital cameras, color films, color paper, photofinishing and graphic arts equipment and materials.

Fujifilm is part of the Sumitomo Mitsui Financial Group financial conglomerate (keiretsu).

History

20th century

Fuji Photo Film Co., Ltd. was established in 1934 as a subsidiary of Daicel with the aim of producing photographic films. Over the following 10 years, the company produced photographic films, motion-picture films and X-ray films. In the 1940s, Fuji Photo entered the optical glasses, lenses and equipment markets. After the Second World War, Fuji Photo diversified, penetrating the medical (X-ray diagnosis), printing, electronic imaging and magnetic materials fields. In 1962, Fuji Photo and UK-based Rank Xerox Limited (now Xerox Limited) launched Fuji Xerox Co., Ltd. through a joint venture.

From the mid-1950s, Fuji Photo accelerated the establishment of overseas sales bases. In the 1980s, Fuji Photo expanded its production and other bases overseas, stepping up the pace of its business globalization. Meanwhile, Fuji Photo developed digital technologies for its photo-related, medical and printing businesses. As a result, it invented computed radiography (CR), which solved a number of issues of traditional radiography, resulting a decrease of radiation exposure to both technician and patient. Fujifilm's systems were marketed and sold under the FCR brand.

Like its rival Eastman Kodak which dominated in the US, Fuji Photo enjoyed a longtime near-monopoly on camera film in Japan. By becoming one of the title sponsors of the 1984 Los Angeles Olympics (an opportunity that Kodak passed on), offering cheaper camera film, and establishing a film factory in the US, Fuji gained considerable market share there, while Kodak had little success in penetrating Japan. In 1994 the vice president Juntarō Suzuki announced that the company would halt paying Sōkaiya, a type of protection racket bribe, to Yakuza. In retaliation of this he was murdered in front of his home by them. In May 1995, Kodak filed a petition with the US Commerce Department under section 301 of the Commerce Act arguing that its poor performance in the Japanese market was a direct result of unfair practices adopted by Fuji. The complaint was lodged by the US with the World Trade Organization. On January 30, 1998, the WTO announced a "sweeping rejection of Kodak's complaints" about the film market in Japan.

21st century
The new millennium witnessed the rapid spread of digital technology, and demand for photographic films plunged in line with the growing popularity of digital cameras. In response, Fuji Photo implemented management reforms aimed at drastic transformation of its business structures. Even as early as the 1980s, the company had foreseen the switch from film to digital, so "it developed a three-pronged strategy: to squeeze as much money out of the film business as possible, to prepare for the switch to digital and to develop new business lines." While both film manufacturers recognized this fundamental change, Fuji Photo adapted to this shift much more successfully than Eastman Kodak (which filed for bankruptcy in January 2012). Fuji Photo's diversification efforts also succeeded while Kodak's had failed; furthermore Kodak built up a large but barely profitable digital camera business that was undone quickly by smartphone cameras.

In March 2006, Noritsu and Fuji announced a strategic alliance for Noritsu to manufacture all of Fuji's photofinishing hardware, such as minilabs. Each company produces its own software for the minilabs.

On September 19, 2006, Fujifilm announced plans to establish a holding company, Fujifilm Holdings Corp. Fujifilm and Fuji Xerox would become subsidiaries of the holding company. A representative of the company reconfirmed its commitment to film, which accounts for 3% of sales.

On January 31, 2018, Fujifilm announced that it would acquire a 50.1% controlling stake in Xerox for US$6.1 billion, which will be amalgamated into its existing Fuji Xerox business. The deal was subsequently dropped after intervention by activist investors Carl Icahn and Darwin Deason.  In late 2019, Fujifilm announced its acquisition of Xerox's 25% stake in the 57-year-old joint venture, Fuji Xerox.

In December 2019, Fujifilm acquired Hitachi's diagnostic imaging business for US$1.63 billion.

Amid the 2020 COVID-19 pandemic, one of Fujifilm Toyama Chemical drugs, i.e. favipiravir, an antiviral commercially named Avigan, is being considered as a possible treatment for the virus, after having been approved by China, Russia, and Indonesia authorities by June 2020.

In June 2020, Fujifilm announced a US$928 million investment to a Denmark-based biologics production facility, which it acquired from Biogen a year earlier for around US$890 million, to double the manufacturing capacity. A tape cartridge using strontium ferrite that could store up to 400TB was showcased by Fujifilm in the late same month.

Subsidiaries
Fuji Xerox was a joint venture between Fujifilm and Xerox Corporation of North America. After the dissolution of their partnership in 2019, Fujifilm made it a wholly owned subsidiary. In January 2020, the corporate name change was announced, from Fuji Xerox to Fujifilm Business Innovation Corporation, effective on April 1, 2021.

Fujifilm bought Sericol Ltd., a UK-based printing ink company specializing in screen, narrow web, and digital print technologies in March 2005.

Fujifilm de México is a Fujifilm subsidiary in Mexico that sells Fujifilm products since 1934 and has been recognized as one of The Best Mexican Companies (Las Mejores Empresas Mexicanas) from 2012 to 2015, a recognition promoted by Banamex, Deloitte México and Tecnológico de Monterrey.

Fujifilm is active in pharmaceutical products and contract manufacturing through its subsidiaries including Fujifilm Toyama Chemical, Fujifilm Diosynth Biotechnologies, etc.

As of July 2020, the Fujifilm Group has two operating companies, which encompass more than 300 subsidiaries in total, and three "shared services companies" under the umbrella. The group structure and a list of some Fujifilm subsidiaries are the following:

 FUJIFILM Holdings Corporation
 FUJIFILM Corporation
 Fujifilm Imaging Systems
 Fuji Color Photo Center
 Fujifilm Medical
 Fujifilm Pharma
 Fujifilm RI Pharma
 Fujifilm Toyama Chemical
 Fujifilm Dimatix
 Fujifilm Diosynth Biotechnologies
 FUJIFILM Cellular Dynamics
 Fujifilm Photo Manufacturing
 Fujifilm Fine Chemicals
 Fujifilm Electronics Materials
 Fujifilm Engineering
 Fujifilm Optics
 Fujifilm Opto Materials
 Fujifilm Global Graphic Systems
 Fujifilm Computer Systems
 Fujifilm Software
 Fujifilm Techno Services
 Fujifilm Techno Products
 Fujifilm Business Supply
 Fujifilm Digital Press
 Fujifilm Media Crest
 Fujifilm Sonosite, Inc.
 Fujifilm Shizuoka
 Fujifilm Kyushu
 Fujifilm Logistics
Fujifilm VisualSonics
 Fuji Xerox
 Fuji Xerox Printing Systems Sales
 Fuji Xerox Information Systems
 Fuji Xerox System Service
 Fuji Xerox Interfield
 Fuji Xerox Advanced Technologies
 Fuji Xerox Manufacturing
 Fuji Xerox Service Creative
 Fuji Xerox Service Link
 Fuji Xerox Learning Institute
 FUJIFILM Business Expert Corporation
 FUJIFILM Systems Corporation
 FUJIFILM Intellectual Property Research Co., Ltd.

Products

Photographic film
 Fujifilm photographic films
 Motion picture film stock. (Discontinued 2013.)

 Fujichrome color reversal (slide) films.
 Velvia: one of the most saturated and fine-grained slide films, valued by nature and landscape photographers.
 Provia: a slide film giving more natural colors than Velvia
 : a fined grained, low contrast slide film often used for studio or portrait applications
 Sensia: a low-contrast consumer slide film; the current emulsion is considered to be identical or near-identical to Astia in the professional line.
 Fortia: slide film, featuring extremely vivid color rendering suitable for flower photography and other high-saturation applications (for Japanese market).

 Fujicolor color negative (print) films
 Fujicolor Pro 160S, 160C, 400H, and 800Z (formerly NPS, NPC, NPH, and NPZ): professional films with different levels of contrast
 Reala: the first film to use the fourth cyan-sensitive layer, currently sold under Superia Reala name
 Superia: intended for snapshots
 Press: Cut from the same emulsion stock as Superia, but cold stored and sold as a professional film.
Fuji Neopan Professional black & white negative film. Neopan 400 and 1600 were designed to use the same developing times, and can be developed in the same tank/machine and developer combination simultaneously. ACROS and SS do not share this feature.
Neopan SS: ISO 100 film, most common and least expensive Neopan film
Neopan ACROS: ISO 100 film, finer grain than SS but usually more expensive
Neopan Presto: ISO 400 speed film
Neopan Super Presto: ISO 1600 for low-light shooting or fast action
Instax instant film packs for Fujifilm's line of instant film cameras

Cameras and lenses
 Fujifilm GFX series cameras (medium format sensor)
Fujifilm X series cameras (all current models APS-C; some past models featured a 2/3" sensor)
 The Fujifilm FinePix series of digital cameras including:
 Nikon F-mount compatible digital SLRs like the FinePix S5 Pro
 Compact cameras like the FinePix F-series and FinePix Z-Series, Fujifilm X100 and X100S
 Waterproof and shockproof FinePix XP-Series digital cameras
 The Clear Shot series of 35mm compact cameras
 Instax series of instant camera
 Fotorama series of instant camera
 Various rangefinder cameras, and older Fujica film cameras
 Professional film cameras such as the GA645, GW670, GW690, GF670, GF670W and Fuji GX680 6x8cm medium format cameras
 Fujinon camera lenses and binoculars: including the most widely used television lenses in the world

Other
 Photographic paper
 Inkjet printer paper
 Magnetic media, including audiotape (also includes the Axia brand) until 2009, videotape, Magnetic tape data storage and floppy disks
 Optical media, such as DVDs and CDs, mostly produced by Ritek and Taiyo Yuden; some by Philips
 Flash memory
Fujifilm X-Trans series of CMOS image sensors.
 Photostimulable Phosphor Plate - X-ray film.
 Base material for LCD displays
 Recording Media
 Microfilm
 Minilab equipments, announced in 2006 a global alliance with Noritsu Koki, together holding a market share of more than 80% of the global market
 Digital X-Ray, digital mammography and computed radiography devices
 Synapse Radiology PACS
 Synapse Cardiovascular PACS
 Synapse RIS
 Ultrasound systems
 Endoscopy
 Specialty Chemicals
 Biologics contract manufacturing and development
 Biomaterials
 Regenerative medicine
 Cosmetics (ASTALIFT series, Nanolift series)

See also

 Fujifilm FinePix
 Fujifilm cameras
 List of photographic equipment makers
 List of photographic films
 List of discontinued photographic films

References

External links 

  (Consumer)
  (Corporate)
  Wiki collection of bibliographic works on Fujifilm

 
1940s initial public offerings
Chemical companies established in 1934
Chemical companies of Japan
Companies listed on the Tokyo Stock Exchange
Consumer battery manufacturers
Cosmetics companies of Japan
Electronics companies established in 1934
Electronics companies of Japan
Japanese brands
Japanese companies established in 1934
Lens manufacturers
Manufacturing companies established in 1934
Multinational companies headquartered in Japan
Optics manufacturing companies
Photographic film makers
Photography companies of Japan
Recipients of the Scientific and Technical Academy Award of Merit
Technology companies established in 1934